The 2016 Independence Bowl was a college football bowl game played on December 26, 2016 at Independence Stadium in Shreveport, Louisiana.  The 41st annual Independence Bowl featured the NC State Wolfpack of the ACC against the Vanderbilt Commodores of the SEC. Sponsored by Camping World, the game was officially known as the Camping World Independence Bowl.

Team selection
The game featured the NC State Wolfpack against the Vanderbilt Commodores.

This was the third meeting between the schools, with Vanderbilt winning the two previous ones.  The most recent meeting was in the 2012 Music City Bowl, where the Commodores defeated the Wolfpack by a score of 38–24.

NC State

Vanderbilt

Game summary

Scoring summary

Statistics

References

2016–17 NCAA football bowl games
2016
2016 Independence Bowl
2016 Independence Bowl
2016 in sports in Louisiana
December 2016 sports events in the United States